Metzingen is a Swabian city with about 22,000 inhabitants, in Reutlingen county, Baden-Württemberg, Germany,  south of Stuttgart.

Geography

The following towns and municipalities are on the borders of Metzingen, they are named starting in the north and belong to district Reutlingen and to district Esslingen: Riederich, Grafenberg, Kohlberg, Neuffen, Dettingen an der Erms, St. Johann, Eningen unter Achalm and Reutlingen.

History

Metzingen was first mentioned in documents from 1075. The cultivation of wine led to a spread of wealth around 1600. 
From the early 1600s it was under the jurisdiction of Oberamt Urach.
During the Thirty Years' War, Metzingen suffered considerable destruction, and two thirds of the population died in a plague epidemic soon after.
From the 1800s Metzingen was under the joint jurisdictions of Urach and Schwarzwald county; and finally under the jurisdiction of just Schwarzwald county from the abolition of the Oberamt to the end of World War II, when it was reassigned to the jurisdiction of Reutlingen (district).

Following industrialization, different textile factories were built in Metzingen. In 1859, Metzingen was connected to the railline from Tübingen to Stuttgart.

Neighbourhoods
Since the municipal reform in 1974 the city of Metzingen includes Neuhausen and Glems.

Glems has about 1,000 inhabitants and is located about 5 kilometers from the core city in a side valley of the Erm valley. Until the beginning of 20th century, Glems was predominantly agricultural. As of 2022, Glems still has some full-time farmers who guarantee sustainable landscape management and supply products from regional agriculture. Local shepherds contribute to the preservation of the cultural landscape of the Albtrauf, which are difficult to manage areas. Buildings from the 17th century such as the church, the town hall and the wine press have been preserved. Glems has renovated its town centre since 2000 and has an active village bakery and the Glemser Kelter is a listed building, used as a fruit tree museum, cider farm and community building.  
The pumped storage plant Glems (Tiefenbachtalsperre or Glemstalsperre) was built in 1962 to supply the region with electricity is located about 1.6 km southwest of the city of Metzingen.

Mayors

Politics
The town council has 26 seats, of which the CDU has 7. Since 8 February 2009, Ulrich Fiedler (neutral) is the mayor of Metzingen with 93% of all votes in the second voting.

International relations

Metzingen is twinned with:

 Hexham, United Kingdom
 Nagykálló, Hungary
  Noyon, France

Economy
Hugo Boss was founded in Metzingen and still has its headquarters there. It started first with its factory outlet and was soon followed by other companies (e.g. Burberry, Reebok, JOOP!, Strenesse, Escada, Bally, Puma, Nike, Adidas, Tommy Hilfiger, etc.) who offer a range of their clothing at reduced prices. There are over 80 so-called "outlet-stores". Metzingen's factory outlets called Outletcity attract people from all over the country and Europe.

Notable people 
 Hugo Boss (1885–1948), fashion designer
 Christian Friedrich Schönbein (1799–1868), German chemist

References

External links

 Metzingen Homepage
 Information portal about factory outlet, leisure and gastronomy
 Information portal and list of shops in Outletcity Metzingen
 Information about Metzingen Factory Outlet Stores
 Information and deals about Outletcity Metzingen
 Official marketing portal from the Outletcity-Metzingen
 Information about Metzingen Factory Outlet Center
 Information about Metzingen Outlet Center
 Information about Metzingen
 Information about Metzingen in German

Reutlingen (district)
Württemberg